Scythian art is the art associated with Scythian cultures, primarily decorative objects, such as jewellery, produced by the nomadic tribes of the area known as Scythia, which encompassed Central Asia, parts of Eastern Europe east of the Vistula River, and parts of South Asia, with the eastern edges of the region vaguely defined by ancient Greeks.  The identities of the nomadic peoples of the steppes is often uncertain, and the term "Scythian" should often be taken loosely; the art of nomads much further east than the core Scythian territory exhibits close similarities as well as differences, and terms such as the "Scytho-Siberian world" are often used.  Other Eurasian nomad peoples recognised by ancient writers, notably Herodotus, include the Massagetae, Sarmatians, and Saka, the last a name from Persian sources, while ancient Chinese sources speak of the Xiongnu or Hsiung-nu.  Modern archaeologists recognise, among others, the Pazyryk, Tagar, and Aldy-Bel cultures, with the furthest east of all, the later Ordos culture a little west of Beijing.  The art of these peoples is collectively known as steppes art.

In the case of the Scythians the characteristic art was produced in a period from the 7th to 3rd centuries BC, after which the Scythians were gradually displaced from most of their territory by the Sarmatians, and rich grave deposits cease among the remaining Scythian populations on the Black Sea coast. Over this period many Scythians became sedentary, and involved in trade with neighbouring peoples such as the Greeks.

In the earlier period Scythian art included very vigorously modelled stylised animal figures, shown singly or in combat, that had a long-lasting and very wide influence on other Eurasian cultures as far apart as China and the European Celts.  As the Scythians came in contact with the Greeks at the Western end of their area, their artwork influenced Greek art, and was influenced by it; also many pieces were made by Greek craftsmen for Scythian customers. Although we know that goldsmith work was an important area of Ancient Greek art, very little has survived from the core of the Greek world, and finds from Scythian burials represent the largest group of pieces we now have.  The mixture of the two cultures in terms of the background of the artists, the origin of the forms and styles, and the possible history of the objects, gives rise to complex questions.  Many art historians feel that the Greek and Scythian styles were too far apart for works in a hybrid style to be as successful as those firmly in one style or the other. Other influences from urbanized civilizations such as those of Persia and China, and the mountain cultures of the Caucasus, also affected the art of their nomadic neighbours.

Scythian art, especially Scythian gold jewellery, is highly valued by museums; many of the most valuable artefacts are in the Hermitage Museum in St Petersburg. Their Eastern neighbours, the Pazyryk culture in Siberia, produced similar art, although they related to the Chinese in a way comparable to that of the Scythians with the Greek and Iranian cultures. In recent years, archeologists have made valuable finds in various places within the area.

Types of objects

The Scythians worked in a wide variety of materials such as gold, wood, leather, bone, bronze, iron, silver and electrum.  Clothes and horse-trappings were sewn with small plaques in metal and other materials, and larger ones, including some of the most famous, probably decorated shields or wagons.  Wool felt was used for highly decorated clothes, tents and horse-trappings, and an important nomad mounted on his horse in his best outfit must have presented a very colourful and exotic sight.  As nomads, the Scythians produced entirely portable objects, to decorate their horses, clothes, tents and wagons, with the exception in some areas of kurgan stelae, stone stelae carved somewhat crudely to depict a human figure, which were probably intended as memorials. Bronze-casting of very high quality is the main metal technique used across the Eurasian steppe, but the Scythians are distinguished by their frequent use of gold at many sites, though large hoards of gold objects have also been found further east, as in the hoard of over 20,000 pieces of "Bactrian Gold" in partly nomadic styles from Tillya Tepe in Afghanistan.

Earlier pieces reflected animal style traditions; in the later period many pieces, especially in metal, were produced by Greek craftsmen who had adapted Greek styles to the tastes and subject-matter of the wealthy Scythian market, and probably often worked in Scythian territory. Other pieces are thought to be imports from Greece.

As the Scythians prospered through trade with the Greeks, they settled down and started farming. They also established permanent settlements such as a site in Belsk, Ukraine believed to be the Scythian capital Gelonus with craft workshops and Greek pottery prominent in the ruins. The Pazyryk burials (east of Scythia proper) are especially important because the frozen conditions have preserved a wide variety of objects in perishable materials that have not survived in most ancient burials, on the steppes or elsewhere.  These include wood carvings, textiles including clothes and felt appliqué wall hangings, and even elaborate tattoos on the body of the so-called Siberian Ice Maiden. These make it clear that important ancient nomads and their horses, tents, and wagons were very elaborately fitted out in a variety of materials, many brightly coloured.   Their iconography includes animals, monsters and anthropomorphic beasts, and probably some deities including a "Great Goddess", as well as energetic geometric motifs.  Archaeologists have uncovered felt rugs as well as well-crafted tools and domestic utensils. Clothing uncovered by archaeologists has also been well made many trimmed by embroidery and appliqué designs. Wealthy people wore clothes covered by gold embossed plaques, but small gold pieces are often found in what seem to be relatively ordinary burials.  Imported goods include a famous carpet, the oldest to survive, that was probably made in or around Persia.

Steppes jewellery features various animals including stags, cats, birds, horses, bears, wolves and mythical beasts. The gold figures of stags in a crouching position with legs tucked beneath its body, head upright and muscles tight to give the impression of speed, are particularly impressive. The "looped" antlers of most figures are a distinctive feature, not found in Chinese images of deer. The species represented has seemed to many scholars to be the reindeer, which was not found in the regions inhabited by the steppes peoples at this period.  The largest of these were the central ornaments for shields, while others were smaller plaques probably attached to clothing.  The stag appears to have had a special significance for the steppes peoples, perhaps as a clan totem. The most notable of these figures include the examples from:
the burial site of Kostromskaya in the Kuban dating from the 6th century BC (Hermitage)
Tápiószentmárton in Hungary dating from the 5th century BC, now National Museum of Hungary, Budapest
Kul Oba in the Crimea dating from the 4th century BC (Hermitage).

Another characteristic form is the openwork plaque including a stylized tree over the scene at one side, of which two examples are illustrated here. Later large Greek-made pieces often include a zone showing Scythian men apparently going about their daily business, in scenes more typical of Greek art than nomad-made pieces. Some scholars have attempted to attach narrative meanings to such scenes, but this remains speculative.

Although gold was widely used by the ruling elite of the various Scythian tribes, the predominant material for the various animal forms was bronze. The bulk of these items were used to decorate horse harness, leather belts & personal clothing. In some cases these bronze animal figures when sewn onto stiff leather jerkins & belts, helped to act as armour.

The use of the animal form went further than just ornament, these seemingly imbuing the owner of the item with similar prowess & powers of the animal which was depicted. Thus the use of these forms extended onto the accoutrements of warfare, be they swords, daggers, scabbards, or axes.

The primary weapon of this horse riding culture was the bow, & a special case had been developed to carry the delicate but very powerful composite bow. This case, "the gorytus", had a separate container on the outside which acted as a quiver, & the whole was often decorated with animal scenes or scenes depicting daily life on the steppes. There was a marked following of Grecian elements after the 4th century BC, when Greek craftsmen were commissioned to decorate many of the daily use articles.

Scythian art has become well known in the West thanks to a series of touring loan exhibitions from Ukrainian and Russian museums, especially in the 1990s and 2000s.

Archaeology

Kurgans are large mounds that are obvious in the landscape and a high proportion have been plundered at various times; many may never have had a permanent population nearby to guard them.  To counter this, treasures were sometimes deposited in secret chambers below the floor and elsewhere, which have sometimes avoided detection until the arrival of modern archaeologists, and many of the most outstanding finds come from such chambers in kurgans that had already been partly robbed.

Elsewhere the desertification of the steppe has brought once-buried small objects to lie on the surface of the eroded land, and many Ordos bronzes seem to have been found in this way.

Russian explorers first brought Scythian artworks recovered from Scythian burial mounds to Peter the Great in the early 18th century. These works formed the basis of the collection held by the Hermitage Museum in Saint Petersburg. Catherine the Great was so impressed from the material recovered from the kurgans or burial mounds that she ordered a systematic study be made of the works. However, this was well before the development of modern archaeological techniques.

Nikolai Veselovsky (1848-1918) was a Russian archaeologist specializing in Central Asia who led many of the most important excavations of kurgans in his day. One of the first sites discovered by modern archaeologists were the kurgans Pazyryk, Ulagan district of the Altay Republic, south of Novosibirsk. The name Pazyryk culture was attached to the finds, five large burial mounds and several smaller ones between 1925 and 1949 opened in 1947 by a Russian archeologist, Sergei Rudenko; Pazyryk is in the Altay Mountains of southern Siberia. The kurgans contained items for use in the afterlife. The famous Pazyryk carpet discovered is the oldest surviving wool pile oriental rug.

The enormous hoard of "Bactrian gold" discovered at Tillya Tepe in northern Afghanistan in 1978 comes from the fringes of the nomadic world, and the objects reflect the influence of many cultures to the south of the steppes as well as steppes art.  The six burials come from the early 1st century AD (a coin of Tiberius is among the finds) and though their cultural context is unfamiliar, it may relate to the Indo-Scythians who had created an empire in north India.

Recent digs in Belsk, Ukraine uncovered a vast city believed to be the Scythian capital Gelonus described by Herodotus. Numerous craft workshops and works of pottery have been found. There at a late date in Scythian culture (c. 250 - 225 BC), a recently nomadic aristocratic class was gradually adopting the agricultural life-style of their subjects. Many items of jewellery were also found in the kurgan.

A discovery made by Russian and German archaeologists in 2001 near Kyzyl, the capital of the Russian republic of Tuva in Siberia is the earliest of its kind and predates the influence of Greek civilisation. Archaeologists discovered almost 5,000 decorative gold pieces including earrings, pendants and beads. The pieces contain representations of many local animals from the period including panthers, lions, bears and deer.

Earlier rich kurgan burials always include a male, with or without a female consort, but from the 4th and 3rd centuries there are number of important burials with only a female.

Museums

The finds from the most important nomad burials remain in the countries where they were found, or at least the capitals of the states in which they were located when found, so that many finds from Ukraine and other countries of the former Soviet Union are in Russia.  Western European and American museums have relatively small collections, though there have been exhibitions touring internationally. The Hermitage Museum in St. Petersburg has the longest standing and the best collection of Scythian art.  Other museums including several local ones in Russia, in Budapest and Miskolc in Hungary, Kyiv in Ukraine, the National Museum of Afghanistan and elsewhere have important holdings.

The Scythian Gold exhibition came from a number of Ukrainian exhibitions including the Museum of Historical Treasures of Ukraine, the Institute of Archaeology in Kyiv and the State Historical Archaeological Preserve at Pereiaslav. The Melitopol Museum of Local History also has an important collection, excavated from a nearby kurgan. This collection, as well as other gold Scythian artefacts, was targeted and stolen by Russian troops during the Russian invasion of Ukraine.

See also

 Scythian metallurgy
History of jewellery in Ukraine
Persian-Sassanid art patterns
Thracian gold
Thraco-Cimmerian
Vettersfelde Treasure

Notes

References
Andreeva, Petya, "Animal Style at the Penn Museum: Conceptualizing Portable Steppe Art and Its Visual Rhetoric", Orientations 52.3 (2020), pp. 48–56 
Boardman, John ed., The Oxford History of Classical Art, 1993, OUP, 

Jacobson, Esther, The Art of the Scythians, 1995, BRILL, 9789004098565, google books
Piotrovsky, Boris, et al. "Excavations and Discoveries in Scythian Lands", in From the Lands of the Scythians: Ancient Treasures from the Museums of the U.S.S.R., 3000 B.C.–100 B.C. The Metropolitan Museum of Art Bulletin, v. 32, no. 5 (1974), available online as a series of PDFs (bottom of the page).

Further reading
 Andreeva, P. "Fantastic Beasts of the Eurasian Steppes: Toward a Revisionist Approach to Animal Style Art". University of Pennsylvania (Diss), 2018. https://repository.upenn.edu/edissertations/2963/
Borovka G. Scythian Art Paragon New York 1967
 Charrière G. Scythian Art: Crafts of the Early Eurasian Nomads Alpine Fine Arts Collections Ltd, New York 1979.
 Reeder E. D. (ed.) Scythian Gold: Treasures from Ancient Ukraine Abrams Inc, New York 1999
 Piotrovsky, B., L. Galanina, and N. Grach Scythian Art Phaidon, Oxford, and Aurora, Leningrad 1987
 Rice, T. T. The Scythians Frederick A. Praeger, Inc. New York 1957
 Rolle R. Die Welt der Skythen Bucher, Luzern und Frankfurt, 1980
 Sher, Yakov A.; "On the Sources of the Scythic Animal Style", Arctic Anthropology, Vol. 25, No. 2 (1988), pp. 47–60, University of Wisconsin Press, JSTOR
 Stoddert, K. (ed.) From the Lands of the Scythians The Metropolitan Museum of Art, New York 1985
 Williams, Dyfri; Ogden, Jack, Greek gold: jewellery of the classical world, Metropolitan Museum of Art/British Museum, 1994, 9780714122021 (many pieces from Scythian tombs)

External links

 New York Times article on 2001 Siberian discovery
 Article on Scythian culture and art
 Scythian artifacts collection

Ryzhanovka
 Archaeology abstract of 1997 article
 the Ryzhanovka Kurgan in Ukraine
Ryzhanovka

 
Jewellery
Scythians

it:Sciti#Arte